Cosmina may refer to:

Cosmina, a genus of flies
Cosmina Dușa, Romanian footballer
Cosmina Stratan, Romanian actress
Cosmina de Jos and Cosmina de Sus, villages in Cosminele Commune, Prahova County, Romania
Cosmina (river), Prahova County, Romania

Romanian feminine given names